Drumheller/Ostergard's Airport  is located  south southeast of Drumheller, Alberta, Canada, immediately east of the community of Dalum and south of Highway 569

See also
Drumheller Municipal Airport

References

External links
Page about this airport on COPA's Places to Fly airport directory

Registered aerodromes in Alberta
Buildings and structures in Drumheller
Wheatland County, Alberta